Berlin, Appointment for the Spies (Italian: Berlino - Appuntamento per le spie) is a 1965 Italian Eurospy film directed by Vittorio Sala and starring Dana Andrews. The film is also known as Bang You're Dead.

It was retitled Spy in Your Eye for American International Pictures' American release where it was double billed with Secret Agent Fireball.

Plot
Secret Agent Bert Morris is sent by his superior Colonel Lancaster on a dangerous mission.  He must parachute into East Germany to rescue Paula Krauss, the daughter of a now deceased scientist who had successfully developed a death ray and it is believed that Paula has his knowledge of how to create the device.  In addition to Morris being up against the Soviets and East Germans, the Red Chinese have entered East Germany to bring back Paula and her knowledge to their homeland.

After seeing off Morris, Colonel Lancaster goes to a clinic to get a state of the art glass eye implanted into his nerves so Lancaster can move the prosthetic eye in a similar fashion to his good eye.  What Lancaster doesn't know is that the clinic is run by Communist agents. They have placed a miniature camera into the prosthetic eye that will act like a television camera allowing the Soviets to see what the intelligence chief Colonel Lancaster can see.

Cast
Brett Halsey as Bert Morris
Pier Angeli as Paula Krauss
Dana Andrews  as  Col. Lancaster
Gastone Moschin as Boris
Tania Béryl  as  Madeleine
George Wang  as   Ming
Alessandro Sperli  as   Karalis
Marco Guglielmi as   Kurt
Renato Baldini  as   Belkeir
Mario Valdemarin  as  Willie
Luciana Angiolillo as  Miss Hopkins
Luciano Pigozzi  as  Leonida
Tino Bianchi  as Dr. Van Dongen
Massimo Righi  as Lavies
Franco Beltramme as  Serghey

External links
 

1965 films
1960s Italian-language films
English-language Italian films
1960s spy drama films
American International Pictures films
Italian spy drama films
Films set in Berlin
Films set in East Germany
Films directed by Vittorio Sala
1965 drama films
Cold War spy films
Parody films based on James Bond films
1960s Italian films